Thierry Brinkman (born 19 March 1995) is a Dutch field hockey player who plays as a forward or midfielder for Bloemendaal and the Dutch national team. He is the son of former Dutch international Jacques Brinkman and the brother of Tim Brinkman, a Dutch football player.

Club career
Thierry started playing hockey at his local club SCHC, whom he left in 2010, to play in the youth ranks of SV Kampong. He made his debut for the first team aged seventeen in the 2012–13 season. In 2015 he transferred to Bloemendaal. With Bloemendaal, he won the 2017–18 Euro Hockey League. In his fourth season with Bloemendaal, he won his first Dutch national title by defeating his former club Kampong in the final.

International career

Junior national team
Brinkman played for the junior national team at the 2013 Junior World Cup in New Delhi, India. At the tournament he scored six goals, helping the Netherlands to a bronze medal. Brinkman again represented the Netherlands at the Junior World Cup in Lucknow, India, where the team finished 7th.

Senior national team
Brinkman debuted for the senior national team in 2015, in a test match against South Africa, in Cape Town. Brinkman represented the Netherlands at the 2018 Men's Hockey Champions Trophy in Breda, Netherlands, where the team won a bronze medal. In October 2018, he was named in the Dutch squad for the 2018 World Cup, which meant he was about to make his World Cup debut. He played in all seven matches and scored four goals, they eventually los in the final to Belgium. In June 2019, he was selected in the Netherlands squad for the 2019 EuroHockey Championship. They won the bronze medal by defeating Germany 4–0.

Honours

Club
Bloemendaal
 Euro Hockey League: 2017–18, 2021, 2022
 Hoofdklasse: 2018–19, 2020–21, 2021–22

International
Netherlands
 EuroHockey Championship: 2015, 2017, 2021
 FIH Pro League: 2021–22
 EuroHockey Junior Championship: 2014

References

External links

1995 births
Living people
People from De Bilt
Dutch male field hockey players
Male field hockey forwards
Male field hockey midfielders
2018 Men's Hockey World Cup players
Field hockey players at the 2020 Summer Olympics
Olympic field hockey players of the Netherlands
HC Bloemendaal players
SV Kampong players
SCHC players
Men's Hoofdklasse Hockey players
Sportspeople from Utrecht (province)
2023 Men's FIH Hockey World Cup players
21st-century Dutch people